Z14 may refer to:
 German destroyer Z14 Friedrich Ihn, a Second World War German destroyer
 HMCS Grizzly (Z14) and HMCS Moose (Z14), two armed yachts of the Canadian Navy
 IBM z14 (microprocessor), a microprocessor chip used in mainframe computers.
 Oshiage Station (Station code Z-14), a train station in Sumida, Tokyo, Japan